
The following is a comparison of notable file system defragmentation software:

Notes

References

External links 
 The Big Windows 7 Defragmenter Test
 The Big Windows XP Defragmenter Test

 
Defragmentation software